Frank Süs (born 4 December 1969) is a retired German football midfielder.

References

1969 births
Living people
German footballers
Borussia Neunkirchen players
Hertha BSC players
SG Wattenscheid 09 players
SV Eintracht Trier 05 players
SC Fortuna Köln players
Bonner SC players
2. Bundesliga players
Association football midfielders